Bicyclus istaris, the velvet bush brown, is a butterfly in the family Nymphalidae. It is found in Guinea, Sierra Leone, Liberia, Ivory Coast, Ghana, Togo, Nigeria, Cameroon, Angola, the Democratic Republic of the Congo, southern Sudan, Uganda, Kenya (west of the Rift Valley) and north-western Tanzania. The habitat consists of wetter forests in somewhat hilly areas.

References

Elymniini
Butterflies described in 1880
Butterflies of Africa